is a memorial park in the center of Hiroshima, Japan. It is dedicated to the legacy of Hiroshima as the first city in the world to suffer a nuclear attack at the end of World War II, and to the memories of the bomb's direct and indirect victims (of whom there may have been as many as 140,000). The Hiroshima Peace Memorial Park is visited by more than one million people each year. The park is there in memory of the victims of the nuclear attack on August 6, 1945, in which the United States dropped an atomic bomb on the Japanese city of Hiroshima. The Hiroshima Peace Memorial Park was planned and designed by the Japanese Architect Kenzō Tange at Tange Lab.

The location of Hiroshima Peace Memorial Park was once the city’s busiest downtown commercial and residential district. The park was built on an open field that was created by the explosion. Today there are a number of memorials and monuments, museums, and lecture halls, which draw over a million visitors annually. The annual 6 August Peace Memorial Ceremony, which is sponsored by the city of Hiroshima, is also held in the park. The purpose of the Peace Memorial Park is not only to memorialize the victims of the bombing, but also to perpetuate the memory of nuclear horrors and advocate world peace.

Notable symbols

A-Bomb Dome

The A-Bomb Dome is the skeletal ruins of the former Hiroshima Prefectural Industrial Promotion Hall. It is the building closest to the hypocenter of the nuclear bomb that remained at least partially standing. It was left as it was after the bombing in memory of the casualties. The A-Bomb Dome, to which a sense of sacredness and transcendence has been attributed, is situated in a distant ceremonial view that is visible from the Peace Memorial Park’s central cenotaph. It is an officially designated site of memory for the nation’s and humanity’s collectively shared heritage of catastrophe. The A-Bomb Dome was added to the UNESCO World Heritage List on December 7, 1996. Many A-Bomb survivors and Hiroshima citizens were pushing for the A-Bomb Dome to be registered as a World Heritage Site as it was "a symbol of horror and nuclear weapons and humankind's pledge for peace."
 This collective petition from many citizens groups was finally given influence when the Japanese government officially recommended the dome to the World Heritage Site committee in December 1995. A marker was placed on the A-Bomb Dome on April 25, 1997 by Hiroshima City. It reads:

Children's Peace Monument

The Children's Peace Monument is a statue dedicated to the memory of the children who died as a result of the bombing. The statue is of a girl with outstretched arms with a folded paper crane rising above her. She is known for folding over 1,000 paper cranes in response to a Japanese legend. To this day, people (mostly children) from around the world fold cranes and send them to Hiroshima where they are placed near the statue. The statue has a continuously replenished collection of folded cranes nearby.

Rest House
 
The Rest House of Hiroshima Peace Park is another atomic bombed building in the park. The building was built as the Taishoya Kimono Shop in March 1929. It was used as a fuel distribution station when the shortage of fuel began in June 1944. On August 6, 1945, when the bomb exploded, the roof was crushed, the interior destroyed, and everything consumable burned except in the basement. Eventually, 36 people in the building died of the bombing; 47-year-old Eizo Nomura survived in the basement, which had a concrete roof through which radiation had a more difficult time penetrating. He survived into his 80s.

The former Nakajima District, which today is Peace Memorial Park, was a prominent business quarter of the city during the early years of the Showa period (1926–89) and had been the site of many wooden two-story structures. However, in 1929, the three-story Taishoya Kimono Shop was constructed, surrounded by shops and movie theaters. It was said that if you went up to the roof, a panoramic view of the city awaited. In 1943 the Kimono Shop was closed and in June 1944, as World War II intensified and economic controls became increasingly stringent, the building was purchased by the Prefectural Fuel Rationing Union.

At 8:15 a.m. on August 6, 1945, the explosion of the atomic bomb about 600 meters above the hypocenter destroyed the building’s concrete roof. The interior was also badly damaged and gutted by ensuing fires, and everyone inside was killed except Nomura, who miraculously survived. The building was restored soon after the war and used as the Fuel Hall. In 1957, the Hiroshima East Reconstruction Office, which became the core of the city’s reconstruction program, was established there.

At the time of the bombing, 37 people were working there. All of them perished, with the exception of Eizo Nomura, who had gone down to the basement at that moment and survived the bombing. Nomura, who was then 47,  was a worker for the Hiroshima Prefectural Fuel Rationing Union. Nomura managed to escape through rising fire and vigorous smoke. However, after his survival, he struggled with high fever, diarrhea, bleeding gums, and other symptoms caused by the radiation.

Although the building was heavily damaged, it still stood and was renovated soon after the war, including a new wooden roof. After the war, the Hiroshima municipal government purchased the building and established a postwar recovery office in it. Today it is used as the Rest House in Peace Memorial Park.
The Rest House has been in debates many times over whether or not it should be preserved. In 1995, the city decided to demolish the building, but the plan was put aside. One of the reasons was because of the announcement of the A-Bomb Dome as a World Heritage site.

Right now, the first floor of the Rest House is used as a tourist information office and a souvenir shop, the second/third floors as offices, and the basement is preserved nearly as it was at the time of the bombing.

Ceremonies

Hiroshima Peace Memorial Ceremony

Every year on 6 August, "A-Bomb Day," the City of Hiroshima holds the Hiroshima Peace Memorial Ceremony to console the victims of the atomic bombs and to pray for the realization of lasting world peace. The ceremony is held in the morning from 8:00 AM, in front of the Memorial Cenotaph with many citizens including the families of the deceased. During the ceremony, a one-minute silence to honor the victims is observed at 8:15 AM, the time of the atomic bomb's explosion.

Lantern Ceremony

In the evening of the same day, Lantern ceremony is held to send off the spirits of the victims on lanterns with peace messages floating on the waters of the Motoyasu River.

Museums

Hiroshima Peace Memorial Museum

The Hiroshima Peace Memorial Museum is the primary museum in the park dedicated to educating visitors about the bomb.
The Museum has exhibits and information covering the buildup to war, the role of Hiroshima in the war up to the bombing, and extensive information on the bombing and its effects, along with substantial memorabilia and pictures from the bombing.
The building also has views of the Memorial Cenotaph, Peace Flame, and A-Bomb Dome.

International Conference Center Hiroshima
International Conference Center Hiroshima is in the Peace Park, west side of the main building of the Hiroshima Peace Memorial Museum.

Hiroshima National Peace Memorial Hall

The Hiroshima National Peace Memorial Hall for the Atomic Bomb Victims is an effort by the Japanese national government to remember and mourn the sacred sacrifice of the atomic bomb victims. It is also an expression of Japan's desire for genuine and lasting peace. The Hall contains a number of displays. On the roof, near the entrance (the museum is underground) is a clock frozen at 8:15, the time the bomb went off. The museum contains a seminar room, library, temporary exhibition area, and victims' information area. The Hall of Remembrance, contains a 360 degree panorama of the destroyed Hiroshima recreated using 140,000 tiles — the number of people estimated to have died from the bomb by the end of 1945.

Monuments

Memorial Cenotaph
Near the center of the park is a concrete, saddle-shaped monument that covers a cenotaph holding the names of all of the people killed by the bomb. The monument is aligned to frame the Peace Flame and the A-Bomb Dome.
The Memorial Cenotaph was one of the first memorial monuments built on open field on August 6, 1952. 
The arch shape represents a shelter for the souls of the victims.

The cenotaph carries the epitaph , which means "please rest in peace, for [we/they] shall not repeat the error." In Japanese, the sentence's subject is omitted, thus it could be interpreted as either "[we] shall not repeat the error" or as "[they] shall not repeat the error". This was intended to memorialize the victims of Hiroshima without politicizing the issue, taking advantage of the fact that polite Japanese speech typically demands lexical ambiguity in the first place. The epitaph was written by Tadayoshi Saika, Professor of English Literature at Hiroshima University. He also provided the English translation, "Let all the souls here rest in peace for we shall not repeat the evil." On November 3, 1983, an explanation plaque in English was added in order to convey Professor Saika's intent that "we" refers to "all humanity", not specifically the Japanese or Americans, and that the "error" is the "evil of war":

Perhaps unsurprisingly, the ambiguity of the phrase has the potential to offend; some right-wing circles in Japan have interpreted the words as an admission of guilt—implicitly reading it as "we (the Japanese people) shall not repeat the error"—and they criticize the epitaph as a self-accusation by the Japanese empire. In July 2005, the cenotaph was vandalized by a Japanese man affiliated with the Japanese right.

Peace Flame
The Peace Flame is another monument to the victims of the bomb that destroyed Hiroshima, but it has an additional symbolic purpose.
The flame has burned continuously since it was lit in 1964, and will remain lit until all nuclear bombs on the planet are destroyed and the planet is free from the threat of nuclear annihilation.

Peace Bells

There are three Peace Bells in the Peace Park. The smaller one is used only for the Peace Memorial Ceremony. Except that day, it is displayed in the east building of Hiroshima Peace Memorial Museum. The more well-known Peace Bell stands near the Children's Peace Monument and consists of a large Japanese bell hanging inside a small open-sided structure. Visitors are encouraged to ring the bell for world peace and the loud and melodious tolling of this bell rings out regularly throughout the Peace Park. The Peace Bell was built out in the open on September 20, 1964. The surface of the bell is a map of the world, and the "sweet spot" is an atomic symbol, designed by Masahiko Katori [1899–1988], cast by Oigo Bell Works, in Takaoka, Toyama. The inscriptions on the bell are in Greek (γνῶθι σεαυτόν), Japanese, and Sanskrit. It is translated as "Know yourself." The Greek embassy donated the bell to the Peace Park and picked out the most appropriate ancient Greek philosophical quote of Socrates. The Sanskrit text is a quotation from Longer Sukhāvatīvyūha Sūtra which was attested by the Indian ambassador. The Japanese text was provided by a university lecturer.

Atomic Bomb Memorial Mound
The Atomic Bomb Memorial Mound is a large, grass-covered knoll that contains the cremated ashes of 70,000 unidentified victims of the bomb.

Cenotaph for Korean Victims

Among the 400,000 people who were killed or exposed to lethal post-explosion radiation, at least 45,000 were Korean, but the number is uncertain, because the population has been neglected as the minority. Additionally, 300,000 survivors of Hiroshima and Nagasaki returned to Korea after liberation from Japanese colonialism. The monument, decorated with Korean national symbols, is intended to honour Korean victims and survivors of the atomic bomb and Japanese colonialism. The monument's inscription reads "The Monument in Memory of the Korean Victims of the A[tomic]-Bomb. In memory of the souls of His Highness Prince Yi Wu and over 20000 other souls", while the side-inscription reads "Souls of the dead ride to heaven on the backs of turtles."

Gates of Peace
Added in 2005, this monument contains ten gates covered with the word "peace" in 49 languages from around the world. The gates represent the nine circles of Hell plus one: "the living hell of Hiroshima caused by the atomic bombing." Each gate is 9 meters high and 2.6 meters wide.

Memorial Tower to the Mobilized Students
The Association for the Mobilized Student Victims of Hiroshima Prefecture built this tower in May 1967 in order to console the souls of over 10,000 students, including those who were Atomic Bomb victims, who died in bombings during the Pacific War. In Hiroshima, there were 8,387 students who were mobilized; 6,907 of which were killed in the Atomic Bombing. The memorial is twelve meters tall, five stories, and is decorated with the Goddess of Peace as well as eight doves which are placed around the tower. To the sides of the tower are plaques which depict the work that the students did, such as factory work, female students sewing, or showing students working to increase food production. There is a plaque in front of the tower which has two buttons that narrate the background information in either Japanese or English.

Other monuments
 Pond of Peace – encircling the Cenotaph
 Peace Clock Tower
 A-bombed Gravestone – gravestone of Jisenji temple – the temple used to be there
 Peace Fountain
 Monument to the Old Aioi Bridge
 Phoenix Trees Exposed to the A-bomb – also known as Chinese Parasols, these trees have deep scars from the blast. They were moved here from the courtyard of the former Hiroshima Post & Telecommunications Office in 1973.
 Linden Tree Monument
 Hair Monument
 Hiroshima City Zero Milestone
 Peace Cairn
 Stone Lantern of Peace
 Friendship Monument
 Peace Memorial Post
 Peace Tower
 Fountain of Prayer – a small fountain pond
 Monument of Prayer
 Prayer Monument for Peace
 Prayer Haiku Monument for Peace
 Hiroshima Monument for the A-bomb Victims
 Statue of Mother and Child in the Storm
 Peace Watch Tower – indicating the number of days since the A-bomb
 Statue of Peace "New Leaves" – from the words of Dr.Hideki Yukawa – designed, carved by Katsuzo Entsuba
 Statue of Merciful Mother
 Statue of a Prayer for Peace
 The Figure of the Merciful Goddess of Peace (Kannon)
 Mobilized Students' Merciful Kannon Monument
 Hiroshima Second Middle School A-bomb Memorial Monument
 Memorial Monument of the Hiroshima Municipal Commercial and Shipbuilding Industry Schools
 Monument to the A-bombed Teachers and Students of National Elementary Schools
 A-bomb Monument of the Hiroshima Municipal Girl's High School
 Monument Dedicated to Sankichi Tōge
 Monument to Tamiki Hara
 Literary Monument Dedicated to Miekichi Suzuki
 Monument in Memory of Dr.Marcel Junod
 Clock Commemorating the Repatriation of Those Who Chose to Return to the Democratic People's Republic of Korea
 Monument of the Former North Tenjin-cho Area
 Monument of the Former South Tenjin-cho Area
 Monument of the Former Zaimoku-cho
 Memorial Tower for A-bomb-related Victims
 Memorial Tower to Console A-bomb Victims
 Monument in Memory of the Korean Victims of the A-bomb
 Monument of the Volunteer Army Corps
 Monument of "Zensonpo"(All Japan Nonlife Insurance Labor Union)
 Monument to Those Who Died From the Chūgoku-Shikoku Public Works Office
 Monument of the Hiroshima District Lumber Control Corporation
 Monument Dedicated to Construction Workers and Artisans
 Monument to the Employees of the Hiroshima Post Office
 Monument of the Hiroshima Gas Corporation
 Monument to the Employees of the Coal Control-related Company
 Monument for the A-bomb Victims from the Hiroshima Agricultural Association
 Monument to Mr. Norman Cousins
 Monument of US POWS {at former Chugoku MP HQ}

Festivals

Hiroshima Flower Festival

Hiroshima Flower Festival is held from the 3rd of May to the 5th during Japanese Golden Week, in the Peace Park and Peace Boulevard.

Hiroshima Dreamination

Hiroshima Dreamination is held in winter.

Access
 Hiroshima Peace Memorial Park bus stop
 Hiroden Genbaku Dome-mae Station
 Hiroden Chuden-mae Station
 Astram Hondōri Station

See also
 Hiroshima Peace Memorial (Atomic Bomb Dome)
 Hiroshima Peace Memorial Museum
 Atomic bombings of Hiroshima and Nagasaki
 Sadako Sasaki
 Children's Peace Monument
 Hiroshima National Peace Memorial Hall for the Atomic Bomb Victims
 Hiroshima Peace Memorial Ceremony
 Hiroshima Witness
 Nagasaki Peace Park
 Norman Cousins
 Marcel Junod
 Peace Boulevard
 Honkawa Elementary School Peace Museum
 Fukuromachi Elementary School Peace Museum

References

External links 

 Hiroshima Peace Memorial Museum (Guide to Peace Memorial Park)
 Hiroshima National Peace Memorial Hall for the Atomic Bomb Victims
 Hiroshima Peace Camp 2011
 hiroshima peace memorial park blog in japanese
 Peace Message, Lantern Ceremony, 2009
 U.S. Attending 2010 Hiroshima Memorial – video report by Democracy Now!

Monuments and memorials in Japan
Parks and gardens in Hiroshima
Peace parks
Peace monuments and memorials
World War II memorials in Japan
P
Atomic tourism